General elections were held in Grenada on 3 December 1984, the first after the U.S.-led invasion that followed two coups. The result was a victory for the New National Party, which won 14 of the 15 seats. Voter turnout was 86%.

Results

References

Elections in Grenada
General
Grenada
Grenada